Kediri Kingdom (also known as Panjalu) Javanese script : ꧋ꦥꦤ꧀ꦗꦭꦸ , was a Hindu-Buddhist Javanese Kingdom based in East Java from 1042 to around 1222. This kingdom is centered in the ancient city Dahanapura, despite the lack of archaeological remains, the age of Kediri saw much development in classical literature. Mpu Sedah's Kakawin Bharatayuddha, Mpu Panuluh's  Gatotkacasraya, and Mpu Dharmaja's Smaradhana blossomed in this era. The kingdom's capital is believed to have been established in the western part of the Brantas River valley, somewhere near modern Kediri city and surrounding Kediri Regency.

Etymology and names
Actually, the city of Daha existed before the division of the kingdom. Daha is an abbreviation of Dahanapura, which means city of fire. This name is listed in the Pamwatan inscription issued by Airlangga in 1042. This is in accordance with the news in Serat Calon Arang, that at the end of Airlangga's reign, the center of the kingdom was no longer in  Kahuripan , but has moved to Dahanapura and calls Airlangga the king of Daha.

Panjalu
In the beginning, the name Pañjalu was used more often than the name Kediri. This can be found in the inscriptions published by the kings of Panjalu. In fact, the name Panjalu is also known as Pu-chia-lung in the Chinese chronicle entitled Ling wai tai ta (1178).

There are three types of land that were used by the community in the past when building settlements and other things. The first is called Anupa, and it is land that has fertile soil, is close to springs, and allows various kinds of seeds to grow well if planted there. The second is called Sadarana, and it is land which in some areas is fertile and in others less fertile. The third is called Janggala, and it is infertile land or wilderness.

The word Pangjalu comes from the word Jalu which means male (Indonesian jantan) and the prefix Pang (Indonesian pe-, thus Indonesian pejantan,  or one who is male), and in this regional context means a fertile and independent area. The term Kadiri is a synonym of the word Pangjalu, and it also means independent.

Kadiri
The name "Kadiri" or "Kediri" also comes from the Sanskrit word Khadri which means India Mulberry (Morinda citrifolia), locally known as pacé or mengkudu tree. The bark of morinda produces a brownish-purplish dye for batik-making, while its fruit have medicinal values. Similar named city also known, Kadiri in Andhra Pradesh, India.
The origin of the word that is considered more appropriate is derived from the word "kadiri" in the Old Javanese language which means being able to stand alone, be independent, stand tall, have personality, or be self-sufficient.

The kingdom was also known as Panjalu the correct reading is Pangjalu as the twin kingdom with Janggala. During the reign of Jayakatwang that revived the short-lived second dynasty of Kadiri, the kingdom is also known as Gelang-gelang or Gegelang. Other than Kadiri, the kingdom was also often referred to as Daha or Dahanapura, after its capital. The name "Daha" was used in later Majapahit period, as the seat of rival court of Trowulan.

Founding of Kediri 
 The Kingdom of Kediri is the successor of Airlangga's Kahuripan kingdom, and thought as the continuation of Isyana Dynasty in Java. In 1042, Airlangga divided his kingdom of Kahuripan into two, Janggala and Panjalu (Kadiri), and abdicated in favour of his sons to live as an ascetic. He died seven years later.

Reign of Kediri kings 

The first king of Kediri to leave historical records was Maharaja Çri Samaravijaya. His royal seal was Garudmukhalancana or Garudmukha, the same as Airlangga's. he reigned from 1042-1051 and succeeded by Çri Jitendrakara Parakrama Bakta in 1051-1112.

It is not known exactly when Çri Bamesvara ascended the throne of the Kediri Kingdom. The Lanchana (royal seal) of his reign was a skull with a crescent moon called chandrakapala, the symbol of Shiva. During the reign of Maharaja Çri Bamesvara himself, there were at least ten inscriptions containing the development of Java in the eastern part around 1112-1135.

Jayabhaya (reigned 1135-1157) succeeded Bamesvara. His formal stylised name was Çri Maharaja çri Dharmmeçwara Madhusudanawataranindita Suhrtsingha Parakrama Digjayottunggadewa. The Lanchana (royal seal) of his reign was Narasinghavatara depicts one of the avatars of Lord Vishnu, namely Narasinghavatara. His form is described as a human with a lion's head tearing the stomach of Hiranyakasipu (King of the Giants). The name Jayabhaya was immortalised in Sedah's Kakawin Bharatayuddha, a Javanese version of the Mahabharata, written in 1135. This Kakawin was perfected by his brother, Mpu Panuluh. Mpu Panuluh wrote Hariwangsa and Gatotkacasraya. Jayabhaya's reign was considered the golden age of Old Javanese literature.  The Prelambang Joyoboyo, a prophetic book ascribed to Jayabhaya, is well known among Javanese. It predicted that the archipelago would be ruled by a white race for a long time, then a yellow race for a short time, then be glorious again. The Jayabhaya prophecies mention Ratu Adil, the Just Prince, a recurring popular figure in Javanese folklore. During the reign, Ternate was a vassal state of Kediri.

Jayabhaya's successor was Sarwweçwara/Sarvesvara (reigned from 1159 to 1171) the royal symbol is named Sarwwecwaralancana, wing-shaped numbering nine and at the end there is a crested circle. Where everything is surrounded by three striped circles.

followed by Aryyeçwara/Aryesvara (reigned 1171-1181), who uses Ganesha the elephant-headed god as Lanchana of his kingdom. and became the (royal seal) of his reign and the Kingdom of Kadiri as stated in the inscription.

The next monarch was king Gandra his formal stylised name was Çri maharaja çri Kroncarryadipa Handabhuwanapalaka Parakramanindita Digjayottunggadewanama çri Gandra. An inscription (dated 1181) from his reign documents the beginning of the adoption of animal names for important officials, such as Kbo Salawah, Menjangan Puguh, Lembu Agra, Gajah Kuning, and Macan Putih. Among these highly ranked officials mentioned in the inscription, there is a title Senapati Sarwwajala, or laksmana, a title reserved for navy generals, which means that Kediri had a navy during his reign.

The eighth king was Kameçvara. His formal stylised name was Çri Maharaja Rake Sirikan çri Kameçvara Sakalabhuwanatustikarana Sarwaniwaryyawiryya Parakrama Digjayottunggadewa. He uses the (winged shell) as his royal seal under the name Kamecwaralancana. During his reign, Mpu Dharmaja wrote Smaradhana, in which the king was adored as the incarnation of Kamajaya, the god of love, and his capital city Dahana was admired throughout the known world. Kameçvara's wife, Çri Kirana, was celebrated as the incarnation of Kamaratih, goddess of love and passion. The tales of this story, known as Panji cycle, spread throughout Southeast Asia as far as Siam.

The last king of Kediri was Kritajaya/Kertajaya (1194–1222), King Çrngga or Kritajaya ruled Kediri, with the official name Çri maharaja çri Sarwweçwara Triwikramawataranindita Çrngga lancana Digwijayottunggadewa. He used a Crnggalancana picture of (Cangkha) flanked by two horns and continued with the words "Krtajaya" above. The presence of a dominant horns makes this badge called Crnggalancana or horned badge. In 1222 he was forced to surrender his throne to Ken Arok and so lost the sovereignty of his kingdom to the new kingdom of Singhasari. This was the result of his defeat at the battle of Ganter. This event marked the end of Kediri era, and the beginning of the Singhasari era.

Relations with regional powers 

The Kediri kingdom existed alongside the Srivijaya empire based in Sumatra throughout 11th to 12th-century, and seems to have maintained trade relations with China and to some extent India. Chinese account identify this kingdom as Tsao-wa or Chao-wa (Java), numbers of Chinese records signify that Chinese explorers and traders frequented this kingdom. Relations with India were cultural one, as numbers of Javanese rakawi (poet or scholar) wrote literatures that been inspired by Hindu mythology, beliefs and epics such as Mahabharata and Ramayana.

In 11th-century, Srivijayan hegemony in Indonesian archipelago began to decline, marked by Rajendra Chola invasion to Malay Peninsula and Sumatra. The Chola king of Coromandel conquered Kedah from Srivijaya. The weakening of Srivijayan hegemony has enabled the formation of regional kingdoms, like Kediri, based on agriculture rather than trade. Later Kediri managed to control the spice trade routes to Maluku.

According to a Chinese source in the book of Chu-fan-chi written around 1225, Chou Ju-kua described that in the Southeast Asian archipelago there were two powerful and rich kingdoms: Srivijaya and Java (Kediri). In Java he found that people adhere two religions: Buddhism and the religion of Brahmin (Hinduism). The people of Java were brave and short tempered, daring to put up a fight. Their favourite pastimes were cockfighting and pigfighting. The currency was made from the mixture of copper, silver, and tin.

The book of Chu-fan-chi mentioned that Java (Kediri) was ruled by a maharaja, who ruled several colonies: Pai-hua-yuan (Pacitan), Ma-tung (Medang), Ta-pen (Tumapel, now Malang), Hi-ning (Dieng), Jung-ya-lu (Hujung Galuh, now Surabaya), Tung-ki (Jenggi, West Papua), Ta-kang (Sumba), Huang-ma-chu (Southwest Papua), Ma-li (Bali), Kulun (Gurun, identified as Gorong or Sorong in West Papua or an island in Nusa Tenggara), Tan-jung-wu-lo (Tanjungpura in Borneo), Ti-wu (Timor), Pingya-i (Banggai in Sulawesi), and Wu-nu-ku (Maluku).

Regarding Srivijaya, Chou-Ju-Kua reported that Kien-pi (Kampe, in northern Sumatra) with armed forced rebellion had liberated themselves from Srivijaya, and crowned their own king. The same fate befell some of Srivijaya's colonies on the Malay Peninsula that liberated themselves from Srivijaya domination. However Srivijaya was still the mightiest and wealthiest state in the western part of the archipelago. Srivijaya's colonies were: Pong-fong (Pahang), Tong-ya-nong (Trengganu), Ling-ya-ssi-kia (Langkasuka), Kilan-tan (Kelantan), Fo-lo-an, Ji-lo-t'ing (Jelutong), Ts'ien-mai (?), Pa-t'a (Paka), Tan-ma-ling (Tambralinga, Ligor or Nakhon Si Thammarat), Kia-lo-hi (Grahi, northern part of Malay peninsula), Pa-lin-fong (Palembang), Sin-t'o (Sunda), Lan-wu-li (Lamuri at Aceh), and Si-lan. According to this source, in the early 13th century Srivijaya still ruled Sumatra, the Malay peninsula, and western Java (Sunda).

Regarding Sunda, the book details that the port of Sunda (Sunda Kelapa) was excellent and strategically located, and that the pepper from Sunda was among the best quality. The people worked in agriculture; their houses were built on wooden piles (rumah panggung). However the country was infested with robbers and thieves.

Culture 
 Celebrated as an era of blossoming literature, Kediri produced significant contributions in the field of Javanese classic literature. Next to the literary works already mentioned, Śiwarātrikalpa and Wrtasancaya by Mpu Tanakung, Krisnayana written by Mpu Triguna, and Sumanasantaka by Mpu Monaguṇa are also notable.

The book of Ling-wai-tai-ta composed by Chinese author Chou K'u-fei in 1178, gave a glimpse of everyday life in Kediri that cannot be found in any other source material, about the government and people of Kediri. According to Chou K'u-fei, people wore clothes that covered them down to their legs, with a loose hairstyle. Their houses were clean and well arranged with floors made from green or yellow cut stones. Agriculture, animal farming, and trading flourished and gained full attention from government. He reported that silkworm farms to produce silk and cotton clothes had been adopted by Javanese by that time. There was no physical punishment (jail or torture) of criminals. Instead, the people who committed unlawful acts were forced to pay fines in gold, except for thieves and robbers who were executed. In marital customs, the bride's family received some amount of bride price from the groom's family. Instead of developing medical treatment, the Kediri people relied on prayers to Buddha.

On the 5th month of the year, a water festival was celebrated with people travelling in boats along the river to celebrate. On the 10th month, another festival was held in the mountains. People would gather there to have fun and perform music with instruments such as flutes, drums, and wooden xylophones (an ancient form of gamelan).

The King wore silk garments, leather shoes and ornate golden jewellery. He wore his hair up high on his head. Every day, he would receive state officials, managers of his kingdom, on a square throne. After an audience, the state official would bow three times to the king. If the king travelled outside the palace, he rode an elephant and was accompanied by 500–700 soldiers and officials while his subjects, the people of Kediri, prostrated themselves as the king passed.

Economy 

According to Chinese sources, the main occupations of the Kediri people revolved around agriculture (rice cultivation), animal farming (cattle, boar, poultry), and the spice trade. Daha, the capital city of Kediri, (suggested to be at the same site as modern Kediri) is located inland, near the fertile Brantas river valley. From the predecessor kingdom of Airlangga's Kahuripan, Kediri inherited irrigation systems, including the Wringin Sapta dam.  Kediri economy was partly monetised, with silver coins issued by the royal court.

In later periods, Kediri economy grew to rely more heavily on trade, especially the spice trade. This resulted from Kediri development of a navy, giving them the opportunity to control the spice trade routes to eastern islands. Kediri collected spices from tributaries in southern Kalimantan and the Maluku Islands. Indians and Southeast Asians then transported the spices to Mediterranean and Chinese markets by way of the Spice Route that linked a chain of ports from the Indian Ocean to southern China.

Fall 

The kingdom of Kediri collapsed during the reign of Kertajaya, and is told in Pararaton and Nagarakretagama.  In 1222 Kertajaya was fighting against the brahmins. Then the Brahmins asked for protection from Ken Arok akuwu Tumapel. Incidentally Ken Arok also aspires to liberate Tumapel which is Kadiri's subordinate area. The climax of the battle between Kadiri and Tumapel occurred near the village of Ganter (Genter), in the eastern region of Kediri. Ken Arok's troops managed to destroy Kertajaya's troops. Thus, the era of the Kediri Kingdom ended, which from then on became the vassal of Tumapel or Singhasari. After Ken Arok defeated Kertajaya, Kediri became an area under the rule of Singhasari. Ken Arok appointed Jayasabha, son of Kertajaya, as regent of Kediri. In 1258 the waning Jayasabha named Sastrajaya. In 1271 Sastrajaya faded into, namely Jayakatwang.  In 1292, Jayakatwang rebelled against Singhasari led by Kertanegara, because of past grudges where his ancestor Kertajaya was defeated by Ken Arok. After successfully killing Kertanegara, Jayakatwang rebuilt the Kediri kingdom, but only lasted one year due to a combined attack launched by the Mongol troops and the troops attacking Kertanegara, Raden Wijaya.

Kediri during Majapahit period

According to Jiyu and Petak inscriptions, during the end of Majapahit era in the 15th century, there was a brief resurrection of Daha (Kediri) as the centre of political power, which was led by Girindrawardhana in 1478 after he managed to defeat Kertabhumi. But it short lived since descendant of Kertabhumi who became ruler of Demak crushed Daha in 1527.

Rulers of Kediri
the era of twin kingdoms

See also 

 List of monarchs of Java

References

General 
 Soekmono, R, Drs., Pengantar Sejarah Kebudayaan Indonesia 2, 2nd ed. Penerbit Kanisius, Yogyakarta, 1973, 5th reprint edition in 1988

Further reading 
 Saidihardjo, Dr. M. Pd., A.M, Sardiman, Drs., Sejarah untuk SMP, Tiga Serangkai, Solo, 1987, 4th reprint edition in 1990

Notes 

 
History of Java
Precolonial states of Indonesia
Hindu Buddhist states in Indonesia
11th century in Indonesia
12th century in Indonesia
1042 establishments
Former kingdoms